The Mixed team competition in judo at the 2020 Summer Olympics in Tokyo was held on 31 July 2021 at the Nippon Budokan.

It was the first time a team judo competition was held in the Olympics.

Team Japan is the only team to win this event at the World Judo Championships, with team France winning the last 3 silver medals.

The medals for the competition were presented by Mr. Yasuhiro Yamashita, IOC Member, Japan, Olympian, one Gold Medal; and the medalists' bouquets were presented by Marius L Vizer, IJF President; Austria.

Results

Finals

Repechage

Pool A

Pool B

Matches

First round

Germany vs Refugee Olympic Team

Mongolia vs South Korea

Italy vs Israel

Netherlands vs Uzbekistan

Quarterfinals

Japan vs Germany

ROC vs Mongolia

France vs Israel

Brazil vs Netherlands

Repechages

Germany vs Mongolia

Israel vs Brazil

Semifinals

Japan vs ROC

France vs Netherlands

Bronze medal matches

Germany vs Netherlands

Israel vs ROC

Gold medal match

Japan vs France

Teams

Men

Women

References

External links
 Draw 
 

Team
Mixed events at the 2020 Summer Olympics
Olympics 2020